Wyeth was an American pharmaceutical company.

Wyeth may also refer to:

Places
 Wyeth, Missouri, United States
 Wyeth, Oregon, United States
 Wyeth Heights, Antarctica

Other
 Wyeth (name), including a list of people with the name
 5090 Wyeth, main-belt asteroid

See also
 Wyeth House (disambiguation)
 
 Wyethia, a genus of flowering plants